Diego Ortiz de Zúñiga (Seville, 1636 - September 3, 1680 ) was a Spanish historian, writer and nobleman. He wrote Annales eclesiásticos y seculares de la ciudad de Sevilla a work about the events in Seville from 1246 to 1671.

Diego Ortiz de Zúñiga, born in Seville in 1636 and died in Seville on September 3, 1680, was a Spanish noble, historian of renown and Knight of the Order of Santiago, Venticuatro* of Seville for some years, author of the Secular and Ecclesiastical Annals of the very Noble and very Loyal City of Seville, Metropolis of Andalucia, a work in which he recounts the occurrences of the city from 1246 until 1671. Additionally he is the author of the Genealogical Discourse of the Ortizes of Seville and of the work Posterity of Juan de Céspedes, Trece* and Commander of the Order of Santiago Monastery.

Family
Son of Juan Ortiz de Zúñiga y Avellaneda, Knight of the Order of Calatrava, Captain of the Infantry, who served on the border of Portugal from 1643 until 1649, married to his first cousin Leanor Luisa del Alcázar y Zúñiga. Diego married in 1657 to Ana María Caballero de Cabrera, daughter of Diego Caballero de Cabrera, Venticuatro of Seville, Knight of the Order of Santiago, and of his wife María Jerónima Caballero de Illescas. His first-born son Juan Ortiz de Zúñiga, married in 1675 with Urraca Fernández de Santillán y Villegas, was awarded by royal decree on 13 January 1705 the title of I Marquis of Montefuerte.

The progenitors of the House of Ortiz de Zúñiga of Seville were Alonso Ortiz (1420-1479) Sevillan, Commander of Azuaga in the Order of Santiago, interned in the temple of Saint Francis of Seville, in the chapel of his grandfathers, (son of Diego Ortiz, butler and guard of King Pedro I of Castille and León, the Cruel, and fifth grandchild of Pedro Ortiz, conqueror of Seville in 1248) and of his wife Mencia de Zúñiga, granddaughter of the famous bishop of Jaén y Plasencia Gonzalo de Estúñiga y Leiva.

Spanish male writers
1633 births
1680 deaths